Acanthais triangularis is a species of sea snail, a marine gastropod mollusk, in the family Muricidae, the murex snails or rock snails.

References

External links
 Blainville, H. M. D. de. (1832). Disposition méthodique des espèces récentes et fossiles des genres Pourpre, Ricinule, Licorne et Concholépas de M. de Lamarck, et description des espèces nouvelles ou peu connues, faisant partie de la collection du Muséum d'Histoire Naturelle de Paris. Nouvelles Annales du Muséum d'Histoire Naturelle. 1: 189-263, pls 9-12
 Reeve, L. A. (1846). Monograph of the genus Purpura. In: Conchologia iconica, or, illustrations of the shells of molluscous animals, Vol. 3. L. Reeve & Co., London. Pls. 1-13 and unpaginated text

triangularis
Gastropods described in 1832